James Michael Lawton (born 6 July 1942) is an English-born former footballer who played as a centre forward in the Football League in the 1960s.

Lawton was born in Middlesbrough, and after playing for his home-town club as an amateur he moved to Darlington in the 1961–62 season. Following 120 league appearances and 60 goals for Darlington, he scored in his last game for the club, a 2–1 defeat of Swindon Town in the League Cup on 22 September 1965; shortly afterwards he was transferred to Swindon in exchange for Alan Sproates and £8,000. However, he only managed 11 league appearances at Swindon in an 18-month stay, and after a short stay at Watford, where he played 13 league games, he returned to Darlington in the 1967–68 season. In his second spell he made 22 league appearances and scored 3 goals before retiring through injury.

References

Living people
1942 births
Footballers from Middlesbrough
Association football forwards
Middlesbrough F.C. players
Darlington F.C. players
Swindon Town F.C. players
Watford F.C. players
English Football League players
English footballers